Penstemon isophyllus, the equal-leaved penstemon, is a species of flowering plant in the plantain family Plantaginaceae, native to Mexico.

It is a recipient of the Royal Horticultural Society's Award of Garden Merit.

The Latin specific epithet isophyllus means "with leaves all of the same size".

References 

 

isophyllus
Flora of Mexico

Endemic flora of Mexico